The 2019 Cork Intermediate Hurling Championship was the 110th staging of the Cork Intermediate Hurling Championship since its establishment by the Cork County Board in 1909. The draw for the opening round fixtures took place on 15 January 2019. The championship began on 27 April 2019 and ended on 16 November 2019.

On 16 November 2019, Blackrock won the championship after a 0-15 to 1-10 defeat of Cloughduv in the final at Páirc Uí Rinn. This was their first ever championship title.

Cloughduv's Brian Verling was the championship's top scorer with 1-43.

Team changes

To Championship

Promoted from the Cork Junior Hurling Championship
 Cloughduv

From Championship

Regraded to the Mid Cork Junior A Hurling Championship
 Inniscarra

Promoted to the Cork Premier Intermediate Hurling Championship
 Ballincollig

Results

Round 1

Round 2

Round 3

Round 4

Relegation play-offs

Quarter-finals

Semi-finals

Final

Championship statistics

Top scorers

Top scorer overall

Top scorers in a single game

Miscellaneous

 Blackrock win their first Intermediate title.

References

Cork Intermediate Hurling Championship
Cork Intermediate Hurling Championship